James H. Birch (fl. 1841) was an American slave trader, tried for kidnapping but acquitted in the District of Columbia. 

Birch was responsible for the kidnapping and selling of Solomon Northup, a free man, in Washington in 1841. Northup wrote a memoir of his time as a slave, Twelve Years a Slave.

Birch later presided over Alexandria’s largest slave pen at 1315 Duke St, operating as Price, Birch and Co. The building is now Freedom House Museum (in Alexandria, Virginia).

Birch was tried but acquitted for the kidnap of Northup. Birch was acquitted in part because the law did not allow Solomon Northup, a black man, to give evidence. Following his acquittal, Birch demanded charges be filed against Solomon Northup for trying to defraud him, but then withdrew the case.

References 

American slave traders
Businesspeople from Washington, D.C.
Year of birth missing
Year of death missing